The Leşu Ursului mine was a large mine in the east of Romania in Suceava County close to Broșteni. Leşu Ursului represents one of the largest copper reserve in Romania having estimated reserves of 18 million tonnes of ore grading 16% copper.

References 

Copper mines in Romania